Roman II Igorevych (ukr. Роман Ігорович, 1177/1179 – September 1211) was a Rus' prince (a member of the Rurik dynasty). He was prince of Zvenyhorod (1206–1208, 1210–1211), and of Halych (1208, 1208–1209).

He was son of Igor Svyatoslavich and Evfrosinia Yaroslavna, the second daughter of prince Yaroslav Volodimerovich of Halych by his first wife Olga Yuryevna of Kiev. His brothers was Vladimir III Igorevich, Svyatoslav III Igorevich.

Ancestors

Footnotes

Sources
Benda, Kálmán (General Editor): Magyarország történeti kronológiája - A kezdetektől 1526-ig /A Historical Chronology of Hungary - From the Beginnings to 1526/; Akadémiai Kiadó, 1981, Budapest;  (the part of the book which describes the events of the period from 1197 to 1309 was written by László Solymosi).
Dimnik, Martin: The Dynasty of Chernigov - 1146-1246; Cambridge University Press, 2003, Cambridge; .

1170s births
1211 deaths
Olgovichi family
Princes of Halych
Eastern Orthodox monarchs